Most Wanted: The Greatest Hits is the first greatest hits album by British-Irish boy band the Wanted, released on 12 November 2021 by Island Records ant it has length 67:00. It marks their first album release in eight years, following the band going on an hiatus after the release of their third studio album Word of Mouth (2013). The album was supported by its lead single "Rule the World".

The standard edition of the album contains 15 tracks, including their UK number ones "All Time Low" and "Glad You Came", all the group's singles, with the exception of "Glow in the Dark", "Could This Be Love", an album track from Word of Mouth and the group's most streamed non single, and two new tracks. The deluxe edition contains five newly recorded acoustic versions of songs off the album, including a cover of "Remember" by Becky Hill and David Guetta, while the extended deluxe contains a cover of "Stay Another Day" by East 17 and an alternative edit and the Shane Codd remix of "Rule the World".

To promote the album, the group performed on Good Morning America and toured in March 2022 in the United Kingdom in support of the album and the group's reunion, with the opening act being English singer and television presenter Hrvy. Most Wanted was the group's final album to feature Tom Parker, who died in 2022.

Tour

Set list:
 "All Time Low"
 "Lightning"
 "Lose My Mind"
 Medley:
 "Behind Bars"
 "Say It On The Radio"
 "Replace Your Heart"
 "Rocket"
 "Demons"
 "In The Middle"
 "Colours"
 "I Found You"
 "Heart Vacancy"
 "Could this Be Love"
 "Warzone"
 "Show Me Love (America)"
 "Rule The World"
 "Walks Like Rihanna"
 "Chasing The Sun"
 "We Own The Night"
 "Gold Forever"
 "Glad You Came"

Background and release
The Wanted released their third studio album Word of Mouth (2013). The album received mixed reviews from music critics, and performed moderately on charts, peaking at 9 on the UK Albums Chart and 17 on the US Billboard 200. The album was supported by their Word of Mouth World Tour, their debut concert tour in 2014.  Before the tour began, the band announced on their website that they'll be taking a break following the tour.

On 8 September 2021, after seven years of their hiatus, The Wanted reunited after releasing a new "Wanted Wednesday" episode, and later announced the album. They originally planned to reunite to celebrate their 10th anniversary in 2020, however, it was delayed due to the COVID-19 pandemic, and band member Tom Parker's brain tumor diagnosis in August 2020.

Promotion

Singles 
On 7 October 2021, The band announced the album's lead single "Rule the World" would be released on 13 October 2021 at 8AM BST, with a music video was released on the same day.  Following its release, the song failed to impact any charts, only peaking at 24 on the UK Singles Downloads Chart.

Promotional singles 
An acoustic cover of "Remember" by Becky Hill and David Guetta was released as the first promotional single off the album. "Colours" was released on 10 November 2021 as the second promotional single off the album, with a lyric video released on the same day. A cover of "Stay Another Day" by East 17 was released as the third promotional single off the album.

Most Wanted The Greatest Hits Tour 
Following the group's reunion announcement, the group announced they will be on tour in the United Kingdom in March 2022 in support of the album, with tickets going up for sale on 17 September 2021. It is set to be their first concert in seven years, following the Word of Mouth World Tour in 2014.

Other promotion 
The group performed on group member Tom Parker's Inside My Head concert at the Royal Albert Hall on 20 September 2021, and also announced that they will do some album live shows during the month on November.

Track listing 

Notes
 Tracks 3-15 are noted as "2021 Remaster".
The vinyl version of the album excludes "Could This Be Love".
The band member cassette versions of the album have "Rule the World" and "Colours" as tracks 14 and 15 respectively.

Charts

References 

2021 albums
Island Records albums
The Wanted albums